Aleksandr Nikolaevich Dityatin (born 7 August 1957) is a retired Soviet/Russian gymnast, three-time Olympic champion, and Honoured Master of Sports of the USSR. Winning eight medals at the 1980 Summer Olympics, he set the record for achieving the most medals of any type at a single Olympic Games. The American swimmer Michael Phelps has now twice equalled this record, at Athens 2004 and Beijing 2008. Dityatin competed for the Leningrad Dinamo sports society.

Biography 
Dityatin was born in Leningrad (St. Petersburg) on 7 August 1957. At the age of 15 he was given special dispensation to take part in the senior USSR championships. Two years later he won the Spartakiades in USSR, an event which was followed by a growth crisis in which he grew 12 cm in one year. At the age of 18, as part of the national team, he came third in the European championships, which were won outright by compatriot Nikolai Andrianov.

Dityatin's first Olympic success was at the 1976 Summer Olympics in Montreal, where he won two silver medals: on the rings and in the team competition. At the 1980 Summer Olympics, after years of being second to teammate Andrianov, 22-year-old Dityatin won a record eight medals in the Moscow Games where he won the all-around title and seven more medals, including two golds to add to his historic achievement of the perfect 10, a feat which had only been recorded by Romania's Nadia Comaneci and the Soviet Union's Nellie Kim in the Olympic Games by then. Shortly after the 1980 Olympics, Dityatin was seriously injured while training, which ended his career. He was the most successful athlete at the 1980 Summer Olympics. As of 2017 he is the only athlete who won a medal in each of the eight gymnastics events at one Olympics.

To add more to the impressiveness of his performance at the 1980 Olympics, not only did he medal in every event, which, of course, suggests an excellent standard of performance throughout the entire competition, but throughout his 24 performances (the maximum # of performances a male gymnast can have throughout an Olympics), he scored no lower than a 9.800 out of 10 throughout those 24 performances, and on 18 of those performances, his score was at least a 9.900.

Dityatin is the first athlete in Olympic history to win eight medals in one Olympic Games. He was also the first male gymnast to be awarded a perfect score of ten in an Olympic competition, a feat he accomplished in the long horse vault.

Dityatin graduated from Leningrad Lesgaft Institute of Physical Education. He was awarded Order of the Badge of Honor (1976), and Order of Lenin (1980, for guarding the State Border of the USSR). Between 1980 and 1995 Dityatin was the head coach of a sports team from Leningrad (Leningrad OKPP).

In 2004, Dityatin was inducted into the International Gymnastics Hall of Fame.

The annual Alexander Dityatin Cup competition is held in his honor in Russia.

Achievements (non-Olympic)

See also 
 List of multiple Summer Olympic medalists
 List of multiple Olympic medalists at a single Games
 Perfect 10 (gymnastics)

References

External links

List of competitive results

1957 births
Living people
Dynamo sports society athletes
Gymnasts at the 1976 Summer Olympics
Gymnasts at the 1980 Summer Olympics
Medalists at the 1976 Summer Olympics
Medalists at the 1980 Summer Olympics
Medalists at the World Artistic Gymnastics Championships
Olympic gold medalists for the Soviet Union
Olympic silver medalists for the Soviet Union
Olympic bronze medalists for the Soviet Union
Olympic gymnasts of the Soviet Union
Olympic medalists in gymnastics
Russian male artistic gymnasts
Soviet male artistic gymnasts
Gymnasts from Saint Petersburg
World champion gymnasts
European champions in gymnastics